Trish Bartholomew (born 23 October 1986 in Saint Andrew Parish) is a Grenadian sprinter, who specialized in the 400 metres. She set a personal best time of 51.29 seconds, by finishing second at the 2008 NCAA Championships in Des Moines, Iowa.

Bartholomew represented Grenada at the 2008 Summer Olympics in Beijing, where she competed for the women's 400 metres. She ran in the sixth heat against seven other athletes, including Jamaica's Novlene Williams and Great Britain's Nicola Sanders, both of whom were heavy favorites in this event. She finished the race in fifth place by one hundredth of a second (0.01) behind Kineke Alexander of St. Vincent and the Grenadines, with a time of 52.88 seconds. Bartholomew, however, failed to advance into the semi-finals, as she placed thirty-third overall, and was ranked below three mandatory slots for the next round. She also tied her overall preliminary position with India's Mandeep Kaur.

She placed 16th in the 400m Athletics category at the 2010 Commonwealth Games.

Bartholomew is also a member of the track and field team for the Alabama Crimson Tide, and a graduate of psychology major at the University of Alabama in Tuscaloosa, Alabama.

References

External links

Profile – Alabama Crimson Tide
NBC 2008 Olympics profile

Living people
Athletes (track and field) at the 2008 Summer Olympics
Athletes (track and field) at the 2010 Commonwealth Games
Alabama Crimson Tide women's track and field athletes
1986 births
People from Saint Andrew Parish, Grenada
Grenadian female sprinters
Olympic athletes of Grenada
World Athletics Championships athletes for Grenada
Commonwealth Games competitors for Grenada
Olympic female sprinters